Methyl ricinoleate is a clear, viscous fluid that is used as a surfactant, cutting fluid additive, lubricant, and plasticizer. It is a plasticizer for cellulosic resins, polyvinyl acetate, and polystyrene. It is a type of fatty acid methyl ester synthesized from castor oil and methyl alcohol.

References 

Methyl esters
Secondary alcohols
Fatty acid esters